Business intelligence software is a type of application software designed to retrieve, analyze, transform and report data for business intelligence.  The applications generally read data that has been previously stored, often - though not necessarily - in a data warehouse or data mart.

History

Development of business intelligence software
The first comprehensive business intelligence systems were developed by IBM and Siebel (currently acquired by Oracle) in the period between 1970 and 1990. At the same time, small developer teams were emerging with attractive ideas, and pushing out some of the products companies still use nowadays.

In 1988, specialists and vendors organized a Multiway Data Analysis Consortium in Rome, where they considered making data management and analytics more efficient, and foremost available to smaller and financially restricted businesses. By 2000, there were many professional reporting systems and analytic programs, some owned by top performing software producers in the United States of America.

Cloud-hosted business intelligence software
In the years after 2000, business intelligence software producers became interested in producing universally applicable BI systems which don’t require expensive installation, and could hence be considered by smaller and midmarket businesses which could not afford on premise maintenance. These aspirations emerged in parallel with the cloud hosting trend, which is how most vendors came to develop independent systems with unrestricted access to information.

From 2006 onwards, the positive effects of cloud-stored information and data management transformed itself to a completely mobile-affectioned one, mostly to the benefit of decentralized and remote teams looking to tweak data or gain full visibility over it out of office. As a response to the large success of fully optimized uni-browser versions, vendors have recently begun releasing mobile-specific product applications for both Android and iOS users. Cloud-hosted data analytics made it possible for companies to categorize and process large volumes of data, which is how we can currently speak of unlimited visualization, and intelligent decision making.

Types 
The key general categories of business intelligence applications are:
 Spreadsheets
 Reporting and querying software: applications that extract, sort, summarize, and present selected data
 Online analytical processing (OLAP)
 Digital dashboards
 Data mining
 Business activity monitoring
 Data warehouse
 Local information systems
 Data cleansing

Except for spreadsheets, these tools are provided as standalone applications, suites of applications, components of Enterprise resource planning systems, application programming interfaces or as components of software targeted to a specific industry. The tools are sometimes packaged into data warehouse appliances.

Open source free products 

 Apache Hive, hosted by the Apache Software Foundation
 BIRT Project, by the Eclipse Foundation
 D3.js
 KNIME
 Orange
 Pentaho
 R
 TACTIC
 Superset
 Grafana

Open source commercial products 

 JasperReports: reporting, analysis, dashboard
 Palo: OLAP server, worksheet server and ETL server
 Pentaho: reporting, analysis, dashboard, data mining and workflow capabilities
 TACTIC: reporting, management, dashboard, data mining and integration, workflow capabilities

Proprietary free products 

 Biml - Business Intelligence Markup Language
 Datacopia
 icCube
 InetSoft
 Splunk

Proprietary products

See also 
 List of reporting software

References